Vev or Vew (majuscule: Վ; minuscule: վ; Armenian: վո) is the 30th letter of the Armenian alphabet. It represents the voiced labiodental fricative, similar to the English v sound as in village. It is typically romanized with the letter V. It was part of the alphabet created by Mesrop Mashtots in the 5th century CE. 

In the Armenian numeral system, it has a value of 3000.

Use in Wikipedia logo

The logo of Wikipedia features the uppercase letter Vev, alongside several other characters from different alphabets. The letter is visible near the upper left corner of the globe on the Wikipedia logo.

Character codes

See also
 Armenian alphabet
 Se, the letter preceding Vev in the Armenian alphabet
 Tyun, the letter following Vev in the Armenian alphabet

References

External links
 Վ on Wiktionary
 վ on Wiktionary

Armenian letters